John Tilbrook (born 10 June 1946) is a former Australian rules footballer who played with Sturt in the SANFL in 5 successive Premiership teams 1966 through 1970 inclusive. He transferred to Melbourne in the Victorian Football League (VFL) for the 1971 season, but didn't receive clearance to play until round 12. After an attempt to convert to gridiron in 1974, plus run of poor form and stints in the reserves, he left Melbourne after the 1975 season. Known as Diamond Jim due to the significant transfer fee from Sturt to Melbourne at the time, he was affectionately called Topaz Tilly by Lou Richards.

Notes

External links 

Profile at DemonWiki

1946 births
Australian rules footballers from South Australia
Melbourne Football Club players
Sturt Football Club players
Living people
Old Melburnians Football Club players